Brenda Jean Patrick (born 1955) is a Texas-based educational consultant primarily known for her position within the educational community that students and parents are customers that the educational system must serve.

Patrick first received public attention during her tenure as a master consultant with the Region 10 Education Service Center, where she was one of the first consultants to bring the concept of customer care to school districts in Texas.  This work has resulted in heightened awareness among school administrators of the need to strengthen the lines of communication with parents, businesses and the community in order to increase student achievement in all areas of academic endeavor.  These programs utilize customer care strategies and techniques that have been effective for companies in industries serving large numbers of customers.

Patrick attended Texas A&M University, Commerce, Texas, where she received her Bachelor of Science in 1981 in elementary education with a history minor. In 1984, Patrick received her Master of Science, Professional Supervisor Certificate and her Mid-Management Administrator Certificate.

Patrick was named the 2007 Texas Educational Support Staff Association (TESA) Administrator-of-the-Year.  She has served as board member for Friends of Texas Public Schools  as well as advisory board member for the Texas Educational Support Staff Association.

In 2019, Patrick was appointed to the North Texas Municipal Water District Board of Directors representing the City of Mesquite, Texas.

References

External links
 Official website

1955 births
Living people
Texas A&M University alumni
American consultants